Seymour Community High School is a public high school in Seymour, Wisconsin administered by the Seymour Community School District. Its enrollment for the 2019–20 school year was 694. The school serves students from Seymour, Black Creek, Oneida, and surrounding areas.

Extra-curricular activities
The football team won the state championship in Division 3 in 1985. The boys' basketball team advanced to the state Division 2 championship game from 2000 to 2007, winning the championship in 2001 and 2006. The team also won the championship in 1997.

Notable alumni
Sandy Cohen (born 1995), American-Israeli basketball player in the Israeli Basketball Premier League
Ty Majeski (born 1994), NASCAR driver
Calahan Skogman (born 1993), actor and former athlete
Jon Dietzen (born 1996), American football player, University of Wisconsin, Green Bay Packers practice squad (NFL), Pittsburgh Maulers (United States Football League)

References 

Public high schools in Wisconsin
Schools in Outagamie County, Wisconsin